Boyadzhiev or Boyadjiev (feminine Boyadzhieva or Boyadjieva) is a surname of Bulgarian origin. Notable people with the surname include:

Boyadzhiev
Biser Boyadzhiev (born 1948), Bulgarian rower
Bozhidar Boyadzhiev (born 1978), Bulgarian wrestler
Georgi Boyadzhiev (born 1943), Bulgarian volleyball player
Hacho Boyadzhiev (1932–2012), Bulgarian television and film director
Ivan Boyadzhiev (born 1938), Bulgarian footballer
Kliment Boyadzhiev (1861–1933), Bulgarian military officer
Miroslav Boyadzhiev (born 1979), Bulgarian short-track speed skater
Stanislav Boyadzhiev (1945–2020), Bulgarian basketball player
Todor Boyadzhiev (1939–2022), Bulgarian engineer and politician
Vladimir Boyadzhiev (1869–1956), Bulgarian revolutionary
Zhivko Boyadzhiev (born 1976), Bulgarian footballer
Zlatyu Boyadzhiev (1903–1976), Bulgarian painter

Boyadjiev
Pepka Boyadjieva (born 1954), Bulgarian academic, philosopher, and sociologist

See also
Boyadzhiev Point, Elephant Island, Antarctica
Boyadjiev–Jabs syndrome
Bojadžiev, Macedonian surname

Bulgarian-language surnames